A discretionary service is a Canadian specialty channel which, as defined by the Canadian Radio-television and Telecommunications Commission, may be carried optionally by all subscription television providers. It replaces the previous category A, category B, category C (instead split into the categories of "mainstream sports" and "national news"), and premium classifications.

Discretionary services may air programming from any of the CRTC's defined categories, although no more than 10% of programming per month may be devoted to live professional sports. Discretionary services may be authorized to offer multiplex channels.

Background 
As part of "Let's Talk TV", a CRTC initiative to reform Canada's broadcasting industry, the Commission announced in 2015 that it would phase out its previous "genre protection" rules, which forbade services with Category B licenses from directly competing with those with Category A licenses (which carried more stringent obligations on their owners, and must be offered by all television providers). The Commission felt that these restrictions were "no longer needed to ensure programming diversity between services", as "[they] limited programming services to offering certain types of programming and precluded other services from offering that programming." As part of these changes, the CRTC began transitioning all pay and specialty services to standardized conditions of license.

In November 2016, per a request by DHX Media, the previous premium television designation (which was designed for pay television services such as The Movie Network, and restricted the carriage of commercial advertising, but could offer multiple feeds consistent with their scope of service) was also removed, merging them into the discretionary services category and allowing them to, if they choose, transition to advertising-supported formats. The standard conditions of license were thus amended to allow discretionary services to offer multiplex channels if approved as a condition of license.

List of licensed discretionary services

Former Category A services

English

 AMI-tv
 BookTelevision
 BNN
 CMT
 Cottage Life
 CP24
 Crime + Investigation
 CPAC (English feed)
 CTV Comedy Channel
 CTV Drama Channel
 CTV Life Channel
 CTV Sci-Fi Channel
 Discovery
 Documentary Channel
 DTour
 E!
 Fashion Television
 FYI
 Food Network Canada
 HGTV Canada
 The History Channel
 History2
 IFC
 MTV
 MTV2
 Much
 OLN
 One
 OWN Canada
 OutTV
 Showcase
 Slice
 Sportsnet 360
 Teletoon
 The Weather Network
 T+E
 Treehouse
 VisionTV
 W Network
 YTV

French
 addikTV
 Canal D
 Canal Vie
 CPAC (French feed)
 Elle Fictions
 Évasion
 Historia
 Ici ARTV
 Max
 MétéoMédia
 RDS Info
 Séries+
 Télétoon
 TV5
 Unis
 Vrak
 Z

Third-language
 ATN Channel
 Fairchild TV
 Odyssey
 Talentvision
 Telelatino

Former Category B services

English

 ABC Spark
 Adult Swim
 Animal Planet
 ATN Cricket Plus
 ATN DD Sports
 A.Side TV
 BBC Canada
 BBC Earth
 Cartoon Network
 Cooking Channel
 CBN
 Cosmopolitan TV
 Daystar Television Canada
 DejaView
 Discovery Science
 Discovery Velocity
 DIY Network
 ESPN Classic
 EuroWorld Sport
 Family CHRGD
 Fight Network
 FNTSY Sports Network
 FX
 FXX
 GameTV
 Global News: BC 1
 HIFI
 Hollywood Suite
 Hollywood Suite 70s Movies
 Hollywood Suite 80s Movies
 Hollywood Suite 90s Movies
 Hollywood Suite 00s Movies
 HPItv
 HPItv Canada
 HPItv International
 HPItv Odds
 HPItv West
 IDNR-TV
 Investigation Discovery
 Leafs Nation Network
 Lifetime
 Love Nature
 Makeful
 MovieTime
 Nat Geo Wild
 National Geographic
 NBA TV Canada
 Nickelodeon
 Penthouse TV
 Playmen TV
 Red Hot TV
 Rewind
 Salt + Light Television
 Silver Screen Classics
 Smithsonian Channel
 Sportsnet World
 Stingray Ambiance
 Sundance Channel
 TBS
 The Rural Channel
 Vivid TV Canada
 Wild TV 
 World Fishing Network

French
 Avis de Recherche
 Casa
 Frissons TV
 Ici Explora
 Investigation
 MOI&cie
 Prise 2
 Télémagino
 Vivid TV Canada
 Yoopa
 Zeste

Third-language
 Aaj Tak
 All TV
 ATN Food Food
 ATN SAB TV
 ATN Sony TV
 ATN Times Now
 ATN Zoom
 Fairchild TV 2 HD
 FPTV
 Filmy
 Mediaset Italia
 Mediaset TGCOM 24
 MEGA Cosmos
 New Tang Dynasty Television
 SSTV
 Telebimbi
 TeleNiños
 Travelxp
 Univision Canada
 ZEE Bollywood
 Zee Cinema
 Zee TV Canada
 Zing

National news and sports discretionary services

English

News 
 CBC News Network
 CTV News Channel
 The News Forum

Sports 
 Sportsnet
 Sportsnet East
 Sportsnet Ontario
 Sportsnet Pacific
 Sportsnet West
 Sportsnet One
 Sportsnet Flames
 Sportsnet Oilers
 Sportsnet Vancouver Hockey
 TSN
 TSN1
 TSN2
 TSN3
 TSN4
 TSN5

French

News
 Ici RDI
 LCN

Sports
 RDS
 RDS2
 TVA Sports
 TVA Sports 2

Former exempted services 
 Disney Channel
 Disney Junior
 Disney XD
 Stingray Hits!

Former premium services
 Crave (Four multiplex channels)
 HBO Canada (East)
 Family (Two multiplex channels, now mostly former analogue cable services)
 Family Jr.
 Family CHRGD
 Super Channel (Four multiplex channels)
 Super Channel Fuse
 Super Channel Heart & Home
 Super Channel Vault
 Ginx TV Canada
 Super Écran
 Starz (Two multiplex channels)

Exempted discretionary services 
Services with less than 200,000 subscribers that would otherwise meet the definition of a discretionary service, and services which air 90% of their programming in a "third language (a language other than English, French, or those of Canadian aboriginal peoples), are exempted from formal licensing by the CRTC. They must still comply with standard conditions of license published by the CRTC, maintain a file with the Commission, and, if this is the basis of their exemption, pursue an application for licensing if they exceed 200,000 subscribers.

English
 AOV Adult Movie Channel
 beIN Sports Canada
 The Cult Movie Network
 Exxxtasy TV
 FEVA TV
 Maleflixxx Television
 MAVTV Canada
 Stingray Country
 Stingray Juicebox
 Stingray Loud
 Stingray Retro
 Stingray Now 4K
 Stingray Vibe
 Toon-A-Vision
 Vertical TV
 Vintage TV
 XXX Action Clips Channel

Third-language

 Abu Dhabi TV
 Al-Nahar TV
 Al-Nahar Drama
 Al Resalah
 All TV K
 ATN Aastha TV
 ATN Alpha ETC Punjabi
 ATN ARY Digital
 ATN B4U Movies
 ATN B4U Music
 ATN Bangla
 ATN Brit Asia TV
 ATN Colors Bangla
 ATN Colors Marathi
 ATN DD Bharati
 ATN DD Urdu
 ATN Gujarati
 ATN IBC Tamil
 ATN Jaya TV
 ATN Movies
 ATN MTV India
 ATN News 18
 ATN PM One
 ATN Punjabi 5
 ATN Punjabi News
 ATN Punjabi Plus
 ATN Rishtey
 ATN Sikh Channel
 ATN Sony Aath
 ATN Sony Max
 ATN Sony Mix
 ATN Star Jalsha
 ATN SVBC
 ATN Tamil Plus
 ATN Urdu
 BBC Arabic
 Big Magic International
 Canada Chinese TV
 Canada National TV
 CCCTV
 Chakde TV
 Channel 9 Canada
 Channel Punjabi
 Channel Y
 CTC International
 Detskiy
 Dream 2
 ERT World
 Fairchild Television
 FTV
 First National
 Greek Music Channel
 Halla Bol!
 HRT Sat
 Hum TV
 Iran TV Network
 KHL-TV
 LS Times TV
 Melody Aflam
 Melody Drama
 Melody Hits
 Momo Kids
 Montreal Greek TV
 NGTV
 Nova World
 OSN Ya Hala International
 Prime Asia TV
 ProSiebenSat.1 Welt
 PTC Punjabi
 Rawal TV
 RBTI Canada
 Rotana Aflam
 Rotana Cinema
 Rotana Classic
 Rotana Clip
 Rotana Khalijiah
 Rotana Masriya
 Rotana Mousica
 RTL Living
 RTS Sat
 RTVi
 Russian Illuzion
 SBTN
 Schlager TV
 TET
 Tamil One
 Tamil Vision
 The Israeli Network
 Toronto 360 TV
 TVCentr International
 TVP Info
 TV Rain
 Vanakkam TV
 Win HD Caribbean
 WOWtv
 Zee 24 Taas
 Zee Bangla
 Zee Marathi
 Zee Punjabi
 Zee Salaam
 Zee Talkies
 Zee Tamil

References

See also 
 List of television stations in Canada by call sign
 List of Canadian television networks
 List of Canadian television channels
 List of Canadian specialty channels
 List of foreign television channels available in Canada
 List of United States television stations available in Canada
 Digital television in Canada
 Multichannel television in Canada
2015 establishments in Canada
Canadian Radio-television and Telecommunications Commission
1